KOBR-TV Tower (also called KSWS-TV Tower) is a 490.7 meter (1,610 ft) high guy-wired aerial mast supporting the transmission antenna of television station KOBR in Caprock, New Mexico, United States. KOBR-TV Tower was built during 1960. The original KSWS-TV Tower was built during December 1956 and was the same height at 1610 ft. It was the world's tallest structure, surpassing previous record-holder KWTV's tower until the completion of WGME-TV Tower in Maine during 1959 September.  During 1960, the original tower reportedly fell in a gale or ice storm .

See also
 List of masts

External links
 
 http://skyscraperpage.com/cities/?buildingID=57151

Towers in New Mexico
Radio masts and towers in the United States
Towers completed in 1960
1960 establishments in New Mexico
Buildings and structures in Lea County, New Mexico